Egypt has an embassy in Montevideo. Uruguay has an embassy in Cairo and a consulate in Alexandria.

Both countries are members of the Group of 77.

Trade
In trading relationships, Egypt is an important trading partner for Uruguay, with over US$26m in soybean sales; Egypt is also an important buyer of Uruguayan lambs. Since 2004 there is a Framework Agreement between Egypt and the Mercosur countries.

Culture
Montevideo has a small Ancient Egyptian Museum, held by the Uruguayan Society of Egyptology (established 1980); a notable Uruguayan Egyptologist is Juan José Castillos.

There is an Egyptian Center for Islamic Culture in Montevideo.

See also
Foreign relations of Egypt
Foreign relations of Uruguay

References